Viscount Savage was a title in the Peerage of England. It was created in 1626 for Sir Thomas Savage, 2nd Baronet, husband of Elizabeth Savage (whom he married in 1602) and heir-apparent by special remainder to his father-in-law's titles of Baron Darcy of Chiche (1613), Viscount Colchester (1621) and Earl Rivers  (1626).

He died in 1635 before inheriting these titles, so on the death of Thomas Darcy, 1st Earl Rivers in 1640 the titles went instead to Savage's son John, 2nd Viscount Savage, who became 2nd Earl Rivers. Thomas' widow Elizabeth was created Countess Rivers in her own right in 1641.

The Savage daughters, Dorothy and Elizabeth, were great beauties, painted by Van Dyck. Dorothy married Charles Howard, 2nd Earl of Berkshire, and Elizabeth married Sir John Thimbleby of Irnham.

The Savage viscountcy and baronetcy became extinct along with the Rivers titles in 1737.

John Savage was created baronet, of Rocksavage, Cheshire, on 29 June 1611.

Savage Baronets, of Rocksavage (1611)
Sir John Savage, 1st Baronet (died 1615)
Sir Thomas Savage, 2nd Baronet (1586–1635) (created Viscount Savage in 1626)

Viscounts Savage (1626)
Thomas Savage, 1st Viscount Savage (1586–1635)
John Savage, 2nd Viscount Savage (1603–1654) (succeeded as 2nd Earl Rivers in 1640)
For further succession, see Earl Rivers

References

Extinct viscountcies in the Peerage of England
Noble titles created in 1626